Blink (Clarice Ferguson) is a superheroine appearing in American comic books published by Marvel Comics. Created by writer Scott Lobdell and artist Joe Madureira, the character first appeared in The Uncanny X-Men #317 (Oct. 1994). She belongs to the subspecies of humans called mutants, who are born with superhuman abilities. 

She was a member of the Generation X, X-Men and New Mutants. Her Age of Apocalypse counterpart is the leader of the Exiles, a group tasked with correcting problems in various alternate worlds and divergent timelines in the Marvel Multiverse.

Blink has appeared in X-Men: Days of Future Past (2014), portrayed by Fan Bingbing, and the television series The Gifted (2017–2019), portrayed by Jamie Chung.

Publication history 

Created by writer Scott Lobdell and artist Joe Madureira, Blink first appeared in The Uncanny X-Men #317 (Oct. 1994).

An unstable mutant with the ability to teleport, Blink was one of the mutants captured by the Phalanx during the 1994 X-Universe crossover event Phalanx Covenant. In print, the character died within a month of her first appearance. The primary-universe version of Blink returned to publication in 2009.

Lobdell and Madureira redefined Blink as a more confident and assertive character in the parallel universe storyline "Age of Apocalypse" (1995). As a result of her redefinition and increased exposure during that event, Blink became a fan favorite, as exemplified in her return in the regular title Exiles in 2001. The character was featured in the four-issue Blink limited series in 2000.

Fictional character biography 
In the primary Earth-616 continuity of the Marvel Universe, Blink was introduced in the "Phalanx Covenant" storyline, in which the extraterrestrially derived techno-organic beings called the Phalanx captured her and several other young mutants to assimilate their powers. This version of Blink was tense and panicky and frightened of her powers (having "woken up in a pool of blood" after her first use of them). Clarice could not properly control her powers, and apparently was unable to teleport anything in an intact form. Instead, any object or person caught in Blink's teleportation field, also known as a "blink wave", would be shredded. She eventually used her abilities to "cut up" Harvest, a Phalanx entity guarding her and her peers, but she was caught in her own teleportation field and apparently died in the process. Because of her sacrifice, the remaining captives were set free and became the X-Men junior team Generation X.

Dark Reign 
When Hercules travels to the Underworld, Blink is among the dead characters seen in Erebus gambling for their resurrection. Unlike the others, Blink just stands there watching them gamble.

Necrosha 
Prior to the events of Necrosha, Selene begins gathering a new Inner Circle consisting of mutants with death-related powers. Taking a ship to the spot where Blink had fought Harvest and reaching into the air, Selene's hand disappeared and Blink was then pulled out of nowhere. Selene reveals to Blink she had actually been stranded in another realm after her fight with Harvest, where she remained in a not-quite-dead state, all the while suffering in agony. After healing her, Selene manipulates Blink by stating she's been looking for her for a while and could hear her crying out for help. Selene furthers her manipulations by telling her Emma Frost could hear her as well but left her behind, claiming she was too dangerous to save. Selene convinces the young mutant to join her cause claiming to be able to put an end to her cycle of pain and betrayal. Several weeks later, Selene and Blink go to New Orleans where Blink kills a man, using her powers to split him into numerous fragments and along with Selene, takes his mansion as a base of operations.

Blink visits Selene's birthplace in Europe before traveling to Rome and New York where they slaughter the New York branch of the Hellfire Club. After they are done, she teleports Selene's forces to Utopia where they attack the X-Men before returning to Selene, where they then journey to Genosha.

When Selene dispatches her Inner Circle to retrieve the mystical knife necessary to complete her ritual, Blink teleports them onto Utopia. In the confrontation, she is recognised by Emma Frost. During the fight, Blink and Senyaka attack Archangel, Senyaka ensnaring him with his coils and restraining him before Blink uses her powers to obliterate Archangel's wings.

After finding the knife, Blink teleports to Genosha with a captured Warpath. Blink is present when Eli Bard gives Selene the knife and is killed in the process. She is later sent along with Thunderbird to watch over Warpath, however he is eventually rescued by the Vanisher.

When Selene began absorbing the many souls around her, she commands her minions to get her more souls to which Blink teleports most of the resurrected mutants and former-mutants to Genosha for Selene to absorb.

During the final fight, Blink evades Domino's shots, using her teleporting abilities to outmanoeuvre her. Blink fails to account for the similar abilities of the Vanisher, who plucks Blink back out of her teleports. He then holds her while Archangel slashes her with his wings, taking revenge for her earlier assault. During Selene's downfall, Blink flees, taking the heavily wounded Mortis with her.

To Serve and Protect 
Sometime after the events of Necrosha, Emma Frost and a small team of X-Men consisting of Blindfold, Pixie, Husk, Warpath and former Sorcerer Supreme Doctor Strange track Blink down in Eastern Europe where she's attempting to resurrect Selene. After a brief battle, Blindfold predicts Blink is going to commit suicide but is stopped by Emma who manages to help her realize Selene lied to her. Doctor Strange steps in and casts a spell which successfully purges her of Selene's corrupting influence. Feeling remorse and guilt over killing for Selene, Blink breaks down and Emma tries to reassure her it wasn't her fault and offers to be there for her as well a place with the X-Men. Overwhelmed with emotion, Blink teleports off claiming she can't and is last seen looking out into the sunrise in San Francisco.

New Mutants 
Following the Schism event, Cyclops commissions the New Mutants to tie up any loose ends, one of them is finding Blink.  Cypher manages to find her, tracking her to a series of natural disasters connected to a band. Working with the New Mutants, they discover the band is being controlled by part of a sentient extraterrestrial ship, creating violent chaos energy as a call for help. After dispatching the sentient ship, Blink is offered the chance of going back to Utopia or Westchester; Blink chooses the latter and joins Wolverine at the Jean Grey School for Higher Learning.

Blink later visits the New Mutants who were depressed over their recent mission to Paradise Island. Learning that it's Warlocks birthday, she teleports the team to Madripoor to celebrate. She later joins the team during their final mission against True Friend, an evil future version of Cypher. She is last seen attending a house party at the New Mutants residence in San Francisco where she assists in helping take down Tyro, Warlock's adopted charge.

Blink returned as a resident in New Tian, in Secret Empire storyline, along many other mutants.

Characteristics

Ancestry 
In the Apocalypse Vs Dracula mini series written by Frank Tieri, it is revealed that in 1897 London, Apocalypse's genetic descendants called the Clan Akkaba had a member called Frederick Slade. Slade was characterized with pink hair and eyes that were tinted green, and he had the ability to teleport himself, others, and selected objects with a 'blink' effect. In the hope that the Clan Akkaba would still continue, Apocalypse's servant Ozymandias made sure that Frederick would sire a child with a woman known as Miss Ferguson. Given the similarity in powers and allusions made within the mini series, it is assumed that Clarice Ferguson/Blink is a descendant of the 19th Century Frederick Slade and Miss Ferguson and therefore a descendant of Apocalypse.

Slade showed up still alive but elderly in an issue of New Excalibur and leading a new Clan Akkaba along with Ozymandias.

Appearance 
Blink also has lilac skin, dark magenta hair, pointed ears and pupil-less green eyes (this was a change in Exiles: both Ultimate Marvel and Age of Apocalypse Blink has white eyes with a blue sheen). She also has pink marks across her face: these are not decorations or tattoos, and were present from birth.

Powers and abilities 
Blink can teleport herself and large masses, including sizable groups of people. She can also use her powers in a destructive manner by teleporting only parts of objects. She can open portals that displace projectiles and even enemies that threaten her. Blink's portals are typically pink and accompanied by a "Blink" sound. She has proven to be a very skilled hand-to-hand fighter, having honed her skills by training with Sabretooth.

Reception

Accolades 

 In 2014, BuzzFeed ranked Blink 46th in their "95 X-Men Members Ranked From Worst To Best" list.
 In 2014, Entertainment Weekly ranked Blink 10th in their "Let's rank every X-Man ever" list.
 In 2017, Screen Rant ranked Blink 11th in their "15 Most Powerful Teleporting Superheroes" list.
 In 2020, Scary Mommy included Blink in their "Looking For A Role Model? These 195+ Marvel Female Characters Are Truly Heroic" list.
 In 2020, CBR.com ranked Blink 9th in their "10 Most Powerful Teleporters In The Marvel Universe" list.

Other versions

Age of Apocalypse/Exiles Blink 

This version of Blink exhibited a more refined power set than her main-universe counterpart.  While the regular Marvel Universe version of Blink originally had little control over her abilities that only evolved after her rescue, the Age of Apocalypse/Exiles Blink has mastered several methods of utilizing her powers. In addition to opening teleportational portals, she can also focus her ability into short, transparent, crystal-like javelins, which teleport whatever persons or objects they touch. She can charge her javelins so they can cut through objects by teleporting the matter elsewhere as they strike or they can be charged to stun opponents unconscious by putting them "out of phase". She usually keeps a supply of these in a quiver around her back, but can make them, one at a time, at will. Her teleportation is always accompanied by a "blink!" sound, from which she takes her codename. She has proven many times to be a skilled hand-to-hand fighter, and it is unknown whether her enhanced agility is the result of simple training or a consequence of her mutation.

Early years 

In the Age of Apocalypse storyline, Professor X was killed years before he ever formed the X-Men. An alternate reality unfolded into which the 5,000-year-old super mutant Apocalypse gained control of North America and implemented a genocide campaign against regular humans.

Clarice Ferguson was born in Cartusia, Bahamas. Her purple skin complexion revealed her to be a mutant at birth. Her parents accepted this fact but feared their daughter would not be accepted by the local population. When Clarice was four, the Fergusons moved to Miami, Florida, in the United States. They hoped Miami would be home to a mutant population where an older Clarice would be able to socialize.

Clarice was a child when Apocalypse took over Miami. Blink was discovered by Apocalypse's Horseman, Mister Sinister, and his right-hand the Dark Beast, who experimented on her, refining her powers.

In the 2000 Blink limited series, it is revealed in flashback that the mutant villain Sugar Man was at one point the jailer in charge of cellmates Illyana Rasputin (the long lost sister of fellow X-Man Colossus) and Clarice (before she was rescued as a young girl by Weapon-X and Sabretooth) in a prison facility.

Sabretooth and Weapon X, members of the resistance force, the X-Men, raid Beast's laboratories and rescue Blink. She becomes the unofficial adopted daughter of Sabretooth, and always refers to him as "Mr. Creed".

Blink grows into adulthood with the X-Men. She is impulsive and not always willing to follow orders, but becomes an important X-Man. In a limited series which focused uniquely on her character, Blink suffers partial amnesia and was briefly transported into the Negative Zone, where she is romantically involved with the amnesiac Annihilus, although he forces her to leave when he begins to transform back into his original form.

Eventually, the X-Men encountered the time travelling X-Man Bishop, who set a course of events that prevented the death of Professor X, eliminating the Age of Apocalypse reality.

Miniseries 
Blink had her own four-part miniseries within the setup of the Age of Apocalypse storyline. In it, she has a falling out with Magneto and travels to the Negative Zone to seek aid in defeating Apocalypse but, due to the travel, loses her memory. She meets a man named Ahmyor who turns out to be the leader of a freedom force dedicated in removing Blastaar from the throne of the Negative Zone. Blink, not knowing who she is or where she came from, joins this force and, in turn, falls in love with Ahmyor- who, they both later learn, is a previous stage of Annihilus, who regressed to this point in his life after his last confrontation with Blastaar and lost his memories. He was the one who Blastaar took the throne from. Blink regains her memory and manages to save Annihilus before teleporting back to her own world to the X-Men who were looking for her.

In a flashback in this series, it is revealed that Blink was once cellmates with the AoA version of Illyana before being rescued by Weapon-X and Sabretooth, and that both of them were tortured regularly by the Sugarman, who was their jailer at the time.

Exiles 

Blink was later on mysteriously transported to a strange desert plateau, where she met a group of other mutants from various realities who had been unstuck in time. A cosmic monitor called the Timebroker explained that each had become "unhinged" from reality, and their new mission was to visit various parallel worlds and "correct wrongs". While the other Exiles would each be returned to their own realities, but altered in some horrible way as a result of being unhinged, if they failed to correct things, Blink was told that she would cease to exist.

Blink became the leader of this group of Exiles – her teammates reasoning that she was more removed from the realities that they were familiar with and would therefore be better equipped emotionally to make whatever judgement calls might be needed if they were forced to fight former allies-, and formed a relationship with her teammate Mimic. They went to many worlds, fighting the Hulk, Galactus, Weapon X, Mojo, and the Vi-Locks among other enemies. On the world where a mutated strain combining the Legacy Virus and the Techno-organic virus was taking over, Blink was infected by it. She was later cured by the intervention of the Norse gods. The Exiles were celebrating when the Timebroker appears, saying that Blink was going home. Blink is teleported away, replaced by Magik.

However, the Timebroker lied and instead of sending her to her home dimension, she was quarantined in a previous reality the team had visited. There, the Exiles were paired up with Weapon X and given the assignment to kill a young child named David Richards, who, left unchecked, would become an all-powerful megalomaniac. Instead, Sabretooth opted to stay and raise the child so that he would not become evil. He had failed. When Blink landed in Sabretooth's reality and helped him destroy Sentinels, David hijacked her teleporting ability and made her kill dozens of humans. Blink was emotionally scarred by the experience, and it was hinted that she would have succumbed to this destructive tendencies up to the point of potential suicide had Sabretooth not saved her.

She was later rescued and came back to the Exiles after Sunfire died. For the next mission, they were given the task of dwindling down the ranks of the two teams to only six members by killing each other. While fighting Hyperion, who seemed invincible, Blink prevailed by teleporting his own laser attack back at him. Then, Gambit—the official leader of the Exiles at the time—blew himself and Hyperion up, thus completing the mission.

Trying to throw off the team dynamic, the Timebroker introduced Sabretooth onto the team. This caused Clarice to doubt her leadership abilities and defer to Sabretooth's advice, a fact that Mimic was not happy about. The Timebroker gave Blink a mission in which she was instructed to kill Mimic soon after, but she refused. When she did, the Tallus shifted from her arm to Sabretooth's, making him the de facto leader.

The Timebroker then tried to disrupt the team by introducing Holocaust, from Sabretooth and Blink's home reality, into their ranks. He also sent the team back to the Age of Apocalypse (implying that by repairing their damaged timelines, Blink and Sabertooth had prevented the erasure of this timeline). However, this had a rather productive effect. Holocaust became obsessed with finding the source of the Timebroker's broadcasts and, experimenting with a shard of the M'Kraan Crystal, the Exiles teleported into the Timebroker's base—Panoptichron. Once there, the team found that the resurrected evil Hyperion had taken over the crystal citadel and had been manipulating their missions for quite some time. The Exiles began to fight him again, suffering the death of Namora and Holocaust as well as the near-fatal wounding of Morph and Mimic. However, it was Blink, once again, who saved the day. Since Hyperion had learned his mistake from their last battle, Blink had to come up with a new strategy for defeating the powerful foe. She did this by teleporting a lot of sand into him, effectively incapacitating him, and then marooning him on his desolate home dimension.

As the events of the House of M warped reality, the Exiles found themselves in the midst of it (since they had decided to drop Beak back home). The mad, reality warping mutant Proteus found himself reborn and was able to escape to another reality before Earth-616 was set right again. The Exiles endeavored to track him down since they felt responsible for his release—Proteus had discovered the existence of alternate realities via accessing the Tallus. Shockingly, Proteus infected Mimic, and Blink was unable to save him before his body withered away into a lifeless husk. This severely affected Blink, and Proteus seemed to retain some of Mimic's memories of he and Blink's relationship and purported to love her. Her relationship with Sabretooth was also affected. The man that she once looked up to as a mentor and called "Mr. Creed" was now only referred to as "Victor", showing the distance that was growing between them.

Swearing revenge, the Exiles tracked Proteus down to the Future Imperfect reality, but were unable to prevent the madman from taking another life. This time Proteus took the body of Morph, but with Blink's quick thinking she was able to trap Proteus in Morph's body by blinking a behavior modification crown onto his head, causing him to believe he really is Morph. With the hunt for Proteus at an end, Blink remained an Exile to continue fixing damaged realities. She and the other Exiles returned all former members of the Exiles and Weapon X that were trapped in the Stasis Gallery to their home realities, dead or alive. Blink was going to bury Mimic in the Panoptichron desert until Power Princess suggested that she check with Mimic's family on burial wishes. Blink returned Mimic to his home reality for burial, and spent some time with his version of the X-Men, almost accepting their wish for her to join their team.

After a mission where the Exiles had to save Galactus, Blink once more called Sabretooth 'Mister Creed'. Blink later left the team to take a break with Nocturne and Thunderbird on Heather's Earth. Blink is called back into action when the New Exiles (minus Morph and Psylocke) are left inoperable after being immersed within the Crystal Palace. Morph summons her, Nocturne, and Heather to help create a new team of Exiles: Beast, Forge, Polaris, Panther, and the Witch. Blink is put in charge of this new team, and pretends to be new just like the others. However, she is found out at the end of their first mission.

Blink is currently starring in Saladin Ahmed's Exiles, which launched in 2018.

What if? 

An alternate version of this Blink appears in What If? vol. 2 #75. In this story, Blink survives, but the other young mutants die in her place. Blink ends up in the realm of the cosmic entity known as the In-Betweener, and seems to kill him in battle. Blink uses her newfound reality-warping powers to "improve" the world, and among other things causes human/mutant conflict to end. When she attempts to save the members of Generation X from their deaths, the resulting paradox (if Generation X survived, then Blink could never gain her new powers in the first place) caused reality itself to begin disintegrating. Ultimately, Blink undid all the changes she had made, and the In-Betweener revealed that he had not died at all. He then took Blink on as his apprentice, training her in the proper use of her new powers.

Ultimate Marvel 
The Ultimate Marvel version of Blink was seen on a view screen and received passing mention during the selection process for Emma Frost's Academy of Tomorrow. However, she was ultimately rejected. Later, Blink is mentioned as having participated and been killed in the premiere episode of a mutant-hunting game show run by Mojo Adams.

In other media

Television 
 An alternate timeline incarnation of Blink makes a non-speaking cameo appearance in the X-Men: The Animated Series two-part episode "One Man's Worth" as a member of a mutant resistance.
 Blink makes non-speaking appearances in Wolverine and the X-Men as a resident of Genosha and member of Magneto's Acolytes.
 Clarice Fong / Blink appears in The Gifted, portrayed by Jamie Chung. This version is a powerful mutant fugitive who joins the Mutant Underground and later becomes the girlfriend of John Proudstar.

Film 
Clarice Fong / Blink appears in X-Men: Days of Future Past, portrayed by Fan Bingbing. This version is a member of a future incarnation of the X-Men from the year 2023.

Video games 
Blink appears in X-Men Legends II: Rise of Apocalypse, voiced by Tara Strong.

References

External links 
 Blink at Marvel.com
 AoA Blink at Marvel.com
 Blink at Marvel Wiki
 UncannyXmen.net Character Profile on Blink
 UncannyXmen.net Spotlight on Blink (Exiles/AoA)

Characters created by Joe Madureira
Characters created by Scott Lobdell
Comics characters introduced in 1994
Fictional blade and dart throwers
Fictional characters from parallel universes
Marvel Comics characters who can teleport
Marvel Comics martial artists
Marvel Comics mutants
Marvel Comics female superheroes
Marvel Comics film characters
Chinese superheroes
X-Men supporting characters
New Mutants